Aditya Patel (born 8 July 1988) is an Indian racing driver that represents Audi India Motorsport. Prior to this, he has competed in the Volkswagen Scirocco R-Cup, Polo Cup, Formula BMW Pacific and the 24 Hours of Nürburgring.

Early career 
Aditya was given his first taste of motorsport in a Go-Kart at the age of four. He began participating in local Go-Karting events at the age of eleven. Although in school, his parents Kamlesh Patel (former Indian racing and rally champion) and Amita Patel were instrumental in showing support in his early career. His first national title came in 2001 when he won the Jk Tyre Junior Karting championship in Goa.

Patel continued to pursue racing as well as academics while trying to strike a balance between the two. It was only in 2007, in his final year of high school, that he won the National racing championship in Single seaters for the NK Racing team owned by Narain Karthikeyan as well Rotax Max India challenge and went on to represent the country in the Rotax world finals held in Al-Ain.

International career 
Patel's international career began with a bang, notching up a third-place finish on his debut in the Formula BMW Pacific Championship in 2008. After a year of racing in Asia, Aditya was given an offer to race in the Volkswagen Polo cup in Germany, which he accepted due to budget constraints in Single Seater racing. From there on he continued to race in tin-tops in the Scirocco R Cup in Germany with two wins and two podium finishes to his name.

In 2012 Patel was signed by Audi India and raced the 24 hours of Nurburgring in an Audi TT for Pro Handicap ev (with teammates Oliver Rudolf and Wolfgang Muller) and won in the SP4T category. He was then given a drive in the JK Racing Asia series where he notched up four Podium finishes and a Win, becoming the first Indian to climb on the podium and win an International event at the Buddh International Circuit.

Aditya participated in the ADAC GT Masters series in Germany with Team MS Racing in an Audi R8 LMS. The series in widely accepted by drivers and teams as one on the most competitive GT Series' in the world today.
He was joined in the car by Daniel Dobistch who has been racing in the series for three years now. Together they made considerable progress and had a few top ten finishes over a span of 16 races in 8 weekends.

In 2014, Aditya had a successful year with Team Novadriver alongside teammate, Cesar Campanico in the International GT Open Series. The duo finished on the podium a total of five times through the year, which included a win at Jerez, and stood 6th overall in the GT3 category. Aditya also had his best GT3 qualifying in Silverstone where he qualified on Pole position.

2015 saw Aditya make a move into the Asian motorsport scene by entering the Audi R8 LMS Cup with team Audi China. After a successful beginning to the season, Aditya entered the halfway mark in the lead of the driver's standings. However, after a couple of tough weekends, capped off the season with a win in the final race and ended fourth in the overall standings.

Aditya participated in the Audi R8 LMS Cup once again in 2016 with team Audi China finishing 6th in the overall driver's standings.

Blancpain GT Series Asia 

Aditya's foray into the Blancpain GT Series Asia began with a commanding win at the Sepang International circuit. Partnering Malaysian driver, Mitch Gilbert, Aditya put in a string of performances finishing on the podium eight times out of twelve races in 2017 which included three wins. A huge tyre blowout saw a sure win being snatched away from them at the third round of the championship in Suzuka. The duo then fought back over the course of the season but however lost the driver's championship to Hunter Abbott by a single point.

Indian Racing League 
In 2019, with fellow Indian driver, Armaan Ebrahim, Aditya created the X1 Racing, the world's first professional franchise-based motorsport league. In 2021, Aditya and Armaan, along with their partners at RPPL, launched the Formula Regional Indian Championship as well as the F4 Indian Championship that will run along the all new Indian Racing League in 2022 across 4 cities over 5 weekends.

See also 
 Amanpreet Ahluwalia

References

External links 

 
 

1988 births
Living people
Motorsport people from Chennai
Indian racing drivers
Formula BMW Pacific drivers
ADAC GT Masters drivers
International GT Open drivers
JK Tyre National Level Racing Championship drivers
EuroInternational drivers
W Racing Team drivers